Morphic may refer to:
Morphic field, a scientific hypothesis
Morphic word
Morphic (band), an American heavy metal band from Royal Oak, Michigan
Morphic (software)
Morphism, a mathematical term

See also
Morph (disambiguation)